John Phillip Landgraf (born May 20, 1962) is the Chairman of FX Networks. He is also a member of
the Peabody Awards board of directors, which is presented by the University of Georgia's Henry W. Grady College of Journalism and Mass Communication. Previously he was President and General Manager of FX Network, a position he held since 2005. TV critic Alan Sepinwall jokingly refers to Landgraf as "the Mayor of TV".

Early life 
Landgraf was born in California to father John R. Landgraf, Ph.D., a pastor, and Barbara Landgraf (née Joslin). When he was very young, his parents traveled constantly, performing as backup singers for the gospel evangelist Rev. Mel Dibble, who was part of Billy Graham Crusades. When he was 5 years old, his mother completed an M.A. in social work and his father completed his PhD in family counseling. In 1969, when he was seven years old, his parents divorced.

After spending much of his childhood moving, Landgraf spent his high school years in Oakland, California, and graduated from Skyline High in 1980.

In 1984, Landgraf received a B.A. in Anthropology from Pitzer College, one of the Claremont Colleges.

Career

Early career 
During and after college, Landgraf did an internship, worked in sales and eventually worked on the production side of the video production company J-Nex Media, a Los Angeles company that made commercial and industrial video.

In 1988, Landgraf was Director of Development at Sarabande Productions, where he eventually became Senior Vice President.

From 1994 to 1999, Landgraf was Vice President of Primetime at NBC where he oversaw the development of The West Wing, and other popular TV shows that included Friends and JAG.

Producing 
Landgraf founded the production company Jersey Television with Danny DeVito, Michael Shamberg and Stacey Sher. Jersey Television was responsible for producing shows like Comedy Central's Reno 911! and Karen Sisco.

FX Network 
In 2004, Landgraf was President of Entertainment of FX Network, responsible for original TV shows that included critically acclaimed shows like The Shield and the Denis Leary-starring show, Rescue Me.

In 2005, Landgraf was promoted to President and General Manager of FX Network, a position that oversees the management FX, FX HD, the Fox Movie Channel and FX Prods. In this position Landgraf is responsible for the operations, programming, development, scheduling, and marketing of the TV channels he oversees.

In 2013, Landgraf launched FXX.

Since Landgraf took on his leadership role at FX, the number of original programs has increased. During the 2015 Television Critics Association presentations, Landgraf expressed concern that while television is undergoing a golden age, there is simply too much television.

Personal life 
In 1997, Landgraf married actress Ally Walker. They have three sons and live in Santa Monica, California.

Landgraf plays the flute. He also sang in a barbershop quartet during his time at Pitzer College.

Filmography 
 1990: Rising Son (TV movie) - associate producer
 1992: Those Secrets (TV movie) - co-producer
 1995: Mad Love - co-producer
 1996: Nightjohn (TV movie) - co-producer
 1998: Mind Games (TV movie) - co-producer
 2000: Celebrity (TV movie) - executive producer
 2001: Kate Brasher (TV series) - executive producer
 2002: The American Embassy (TV series) - executive producer
 2001-2004: UC: Undercover (TV series) - executive producer, 4 episodes
 2002: The Funkhousers (TV movie) - executive producer
 2003: Other People's Business (TV movie) - executive producer
 2004-2009: Reno 911! - executive producer, 13 episodes
 2004: Karen Sisco (TV series) - executive producer, 1 episode; writer, 1 episode: "No One's Girl"
 2005-2008: 30 Days - executive producer
 2007: Reno 911!: Miami - producer

Awards 
 1984-1985: Coro Fellowship
 Chair Appointee to the Executive Committee of the Academy of Television Arts and Sciences Board of Governors
 2012: NCTA Vanguard Award for Programming
 2013: Adweek’s TV Executive of the Year.
 2014: Variety's Creative Leadership Award

Works and publications

References

External links 

 John Landgraf at 21st Century Fox
 

Pitzer College alumni
Television producers from California
American television executives
Living people
1962 births